Chiloglanis angolensis is a species of upside-down catfish endemic to Angola where it occurs in the Cuango River and the Rio Coroca. This species grows to a length of  SL.

References

External links 

angolensis
Catfish of Africa
Freshwater fish of Angola
Endemic fauna of Angola
Fish described in 1967